Esad Komić (born 29 February 1944 in Bosanska Krupa) is a former Yugoslav professional footballer.

He played for Bratstvo, FK Borac Banja Luka, and HNK Šibenik, in Yugoslavia, and Olympique de Marseille, France.

He currently lives in the Salt Lake City, Utah, USA.

Died 31 August 2022 in Salt Lake City

References

1944 births
Living people
Yugoslav footballers
FK Borac Banja Luka players
HNK Šibenik players

Association footballers not categorized by position